Kazimir Vulić (born 10 June 1967 in Posedarje) is a Croatian retired football midfielder and currently coach.

International career
He played two matches for Croatia, both July 1992 friendly matches away against Australia.

References

External links
 

1967 births
Living people
People from Zadar County
Association football midfielders
Yugoslav footballers
Croatian footballers
Croatia international footballers
NK Zadar players
HNK Rijeka players
Grazer AK players
HNK Hajduk Split players
Sichuan Guancheng players
NK Troglav 1918 Livno players
NK Brotnjo players
NK Solin players
Yugoslav Second League players
Yugoslav First League players
Croatian Football League players
2. Liga (Austria) players
China League One players
Premier League of Bosnia and Herzegovina players
First Football League (Croatia) players
Croatian expatriate footballers
Expatriate footballers in Austria
Croatian expatriate sportspeople in Austria
Expatriate footballers in China
Croatian expatriate sportspeople in China
Expatriate footballers in Bosnia and Herzegovina
Croatian expatriate sportspeople in Bosnia and Herzegovina
Croatian football managers
Expatriate football managers in China